Erythromeris is a genus of moths in the family Saturniidae.

Species
Erythromeris flexilineata (Dognin, 1911)
Erythromeris obscurior Lemaire, 1975
Erythromeris saturniata (Walker, 1865)

References

Hemileucinae